Sumalee Montano (born August 3, 1972) is an American actress who worked as an investment bank analyst in New York City and Hong Kong before starting her acting career.

For TV and film, Sumalee has appeared on Close to Home, Days of Our Lives, Nashville, Scandal, The Young and the Restless, This Is Us and Veep. As a voice actress, she has provided the voices of Pudding in Space Channel 5 and its sequel, Arcee on Transformers: Prime, Cali in the Skylanders series, Katana on Beware the Batman, the President in Saints Row IV, the female Inquisitor in Dragon Age: Inquisition, and Yuna in Ghost of Tsushima. She has also guest starred as Nila on the web series Critical Role.

Sumalee Montano resides and works in Los Angeles but was born in Columbus, Ohio.

Early life 
Montano is of Filipino and Thai descent and grew up mostly in the United States, but also spent a few years in Bangkok, Thailand. During her high school career, she began acting as an extracurricular activity. Her granduncle is Filipino actor and writer Severino Montano.

Education and acting career 
She graduated from Harvard University in 1993 and is a U.S. Fulbright scholar. After graduation, she worked as an investment banking analyst for Morgan Stanley for a few years.  After realizing investment banking wasn't something she was passionate about, Montano quit and went backpacking through Africa before realizing she wanted to pursue acting professionally.

Montano has taken on a variety of different roles, both live-action and voice-over. She is talented in using many different accents, including Chinese, Filipino, British, Southern, Thai, Vietnamese, Eastern European and Japanese. Her first voice acting role was as Pudding in the 1999 music-rhythm game, Space Channel 5. Her first major acting role was playing the nurse Duvata Mahal for three seasons of the TV show ER.

In 2021, Sumalee Montano gained acclaim for her role as Inoue Sato in the Peacock TV series The Lost Symbol. Following her portrayal as Sato, she had also appeared in the 2021 animated Disney series The Ghost and Molly McGee, voicing Sharon McGee, the titular character's mother, and Grandma Nin.

Filmography

Voice acting

Video games

Film

Animation

Live-action

Television

Film

References

External links 

 
 
 

Living people
American actresses of Filipino descent
American film actresses
American people of Thai descent
American television actresses
American video game actresses
American voice actresses
Harvard University alumni
21st-century American women
Sumalee Montano
Filipino voice actresses
1972 births